On the Come Up, published on February 5, 2019, by Balzer + Bray, is a young adult novel by Angie Thomas . It tells the story of Bri, a sixteen-year old rapper hoping to fill the shoes of her father and "make it" as an underground hip-hop legend. Overnight, Bri becomes an internet sensation after posting a rap hit which sparks controversy. As Bri defeats the odds to "make it" she battles controversy to achieve her dreams. It is set in the same universe (Garden Heights) as Thomas' first book The Hate U Give.

Main characters
 Brianna Jackson—Brianna is the daughter of Jay and Lawless and younger sister to Trey. She is also called Bri or 'Lil Law,' after her late father. She is an aspiring rap legend. In her efforts to "make it" as a rapper, her songs sparked controversy in her community. At school, she has a reputation amongst the teachers as a hoodlum for her "aggressive" behavior.
 Jayda "Jay" Jackson—Brianna and Trey's caring mother. After the murder of her husband, she turned to drugs and suffered from depression but later stopped for fear of losing her kids. She later loses her job and struggles to find other options but always puts her kids first.
 Lawrence "Lawless" Jackson—Brianna and Trey's father, Jay's husband. He was an underground rap legend but was murdered before he was able to "make it" mainstream as a rapper.
 Trey Jackson—Brianna's older brother, Jay and Lawless's son. He is accomplished, as he received a scholarship and later achieved a degree in college. He worked at a pizza place to make ends meet for Jay and Brianna.
 Aunt Pooh—the aunt to Brianna and Trey, as well as the younger sister to Jay. Aunt Pooh is notoriously known as a drug dealer but maintains a close relationship with Brianna.
 Sonny—loyal, and old friend to Brianna. He supports her regardless, even through the controversy Brianna has suffered.
 Malik—Brianna's crush, and also a close friend. He is loyal to Brianna, but later dates another girl.

Secondary characters
 Kayla—Trey's girlfriend. She works at the pizza place with him, as well is known as a rapping queen.
 Curtis—Brianna's boyfriend. He's sweet and respects Bri.
 Milez—the son of Supreme. Sonny's crush. Has his own following as a second-rate rapper. Lives in the suburbs instead of the projects.
 Supreme—Supreme was Lawless's old advisor. He later convinces Brianna to take him on.
 Grandma and Granddaddy—the paternal grandparents of Brianna, who took care of her and Trey when Jay was recovering from addiction.
 Jojo—young follower of Brianna, hopes to be a rapper.
 Scrap—Aunt Pooh's friend.
 Shana—Malik's girlfriend.
Lena—Aunt Pooh's girlfriend.

Reception 
The book was well reviewed by The New York Times, Vox, and The Washington Post.

The American Library Association named the book one of the best released for young adults in 2020.

Awards 
On the Come Up received several accolades:

 2020 - American Library Association (ALA), Top Ten Books for Young Adults
 2020 - Carnegie Medal for Young Adult Fiction nominee
2020 - The Amelia Bloomer Book List  
2020 - ALA Top Ten Amazing Audiobooks for Young Adults 
 2019 - Kirkus Prize for Young Readers' Literature nominee
 2019 - Goodreads Choice Award for Young Adult Fiction nominee
 2019 - Boston Globe-Horn Book Award for Fiction & Poetry nominee

Film adaptation 

On February 4, 2019, Fox 2000 Pictures acquired the rights to adapt the novel with George Tillman Jr. directing and producing with Robert Teitel, and Jay Marcus from State Street Pictures, alongside Thomas Marty Bowen, Isaac Klausner and John Fischer of Temple Hill Entertainment. On December 11, 2019, after Disney acquisition of 21st Century Fox and closing of Fox 2000, Paramount Players acquired the film adaptation with Kay Oyegun hired to write the script and Tillman Jr. still attached to direct. On October 19, 2020, Wanuri Kahiu replaced Tillman Jr. as director of the film. On June 10, 2021, it was announced that Sanaa Lathan would make her directorial debut with the film, replacing Kahiu.

The film has been announced as premiering at the 2022 Toronto International Film Festival. It was also announced that the adaptation would release on September 23, 2022, both in limited theaters and on the streaming service Paramount+.

References

2019 American novels
African-American novels
African-American young adult novels
Novels about race and ethnicity
Novels set in the 21st century
Novels set in the United States
Novels about racism
Novels about music
Literature by African-American women
Balzer + Bray books